Dargeh-ye Cheshmeh Said (also Romanized as Dargeh-ye Cheshmeh Saʿīd) is a village in Mahidasht Rural District, Mahidasht District, Kermanshah County, Kermanshah Province, Iran. At the 2006 census, its population was 55, in 15 families.

References 

Populated places in Kermanshah County